Ornamental plants or garden plants are plants that are primarily grown for their beauty but also for qualities such as scent or how they shape physical space.  Many flowering plants and garden varieties tend to be specially bred cultivars that improve on the original species in qualities such as color, shape, scent, and long-lasting blooms. There are many examples of fine ornamental plants that can provide height, privacy, and beauty for any garden. These ornamental perennial plants have seeds that allow them to reproduce. One of the beauties of ornamental grasses is that they are very versatile and low maintenance.  Almost any types of plant have ornamental varieties: trees, shrubs, climbers, grasses, succulents, aquatic plants, herbaceous perennials and annual plants. Non-botanical classifications include houseplants, bedding plants, hedges, plants for cut flowers and foliage plants. The cultivation of ornamental plants comes under floriculture and tree nurseries, which is a major branch of horticulture.

Commonly, ornamental garden plants are grown for the display of aesthetic features including flowers, leaves, scent, overall foliage texture, fruit, stem and bark, and aesthetic form. In some cases, unusual features may be considered to be of interest, such as the prominent thorns of Rosa sericea and cacti.

History
The cultivation of ornamental plants in gardening began in ancient civilizations around 2000 BC. Ancient Egyptian tomb paintings of the 1500 BC show physical evidence of ornamental horticulture and landscape design. The wealthy pharaohs of Amun had plenty of lands to grow all different kinds of ornamental plants.

Cultivation

Ornamental plants and trees are distinguished from utilitarian and crop plants, such as those used for agriculture and vegetable crops, and for forestry or as fruit trees. This does not preclude any particular type of plant being grown both for ornamental qualities in the garden, and for utilitarian purposes in other settings. Thus lavender is typically grown as an ornamental plant in gardens, but may also be grown as a crop plant for the production of lavender oil.

The term
The term ornamental plant is used here in the same sense that it is generally used in the horticultural trades, in which they are often just called "ornamentals".  The term largely corresponds to 'garden plant', though the latter is much less precise, as any plant may be grown in a garden. Ornamental plants are plants that are grown for display purposes, rather than functional ones. While some plants are both ornamental and functional, people usually use the term “ornamental plants” to refer to plants which have no value beyond being attractive, although many people feel that this is value enough. Ornamental plants are the keystone of ornamental gardening, and they come in a range of shapes, sizes, and colors suitable to a broad array of climates, landscapes, and gardening needs.

Some ornamental plants are foliage plants grown mainly or entirely for their showy foliage; this is especially true of houseplants. Their foliage may be deciduous, turning bright orange, red, and yellow before dropping off in the fall, or evergreen, in which case it stays green year-round. Some ornamental foliage has a striking appearance created by lacy leaves or long needles, while other ornamentals are grown for distinctively colored leaves, such as silvery-gray ground covers and bright red grasses, among many others.

Other ornamental plants are cultivated for their blooms. Flowering ornamental plants are a key aspect of most gardens, with many flower gardeners preferring to plant a variety of flowers so that the garden is continuously in flower through the spring and summer. Depending on the types of plants being grown, the flowers may be subtle and delicate, or large and showy, with some ornamental plants producing distinctive aromas. Ornamental plants are beneficial.

Ornamental grasses

Ornamental grasses and grass-like plants are valued in home landscapes for their hardiness, ease of care, dramatic appearance, and a wide variety of colors, textures, and sizes available. Many ornamental types of grass are true grasses (Poaceae), however, several other families of grass-like plants are typically marketed as ornamental grasses. These include the sedges (Cyperaceae), rushes (Juncaceae), restios (Restionaceae), and cat-tails (Typhaceae). All are monocotyledons, typically with narrow leaves and parallel veins. Most are herbaceous perennials, though many are evergreen and some develop woody tissues. Ornamental grasses are popular in many countries. They bring striking linear form, texture, color, motion, and sound to the garden, throughout the year.

Ornamental grasses are popular in many colder hardiness zones for their resilience to cold temperatures and aesthetic value throughout the fall and winter seasons.

See also

 Ornamental bulbous plant

References

External links